Myriolecis is a genus of lichen in the family Lecanoraceae. It was originally circumscribed in 1909 by Frederic E. Clements with Myriolecis sambuci as the type species. The genus was later reinstated to accommodate the Lecanora disperse group and Arctopeltis. Molecular phylogenetic data showed that this group of species formed a clade that is genetically distinct from Lecanora, and Myriolecis was the oldest name available to hold these species.

Species
Myriolecis actophila (Wedd.) M.Bertrand & Cl.Roux (2016)
Myriolecis agardhiana (Ach.) Śliwa, Zhao Xin & Lumbsch (2015)
Myriolecis altunica R.Mamut & A.Abbas (2019)
Myriolecis antiqua (J.R.Laundon) Śliwa, Zhao Xin & Lumbsch (2015)
Myriolecis bandolensis (B.de Lesd.) M.Bertrand, Cl.Roux & Nimis (2016)
Myriolecis behringii (Nyl.) Hafellner (2016)
Myriolecis caesioalutacea (H.Magn.) R.Mamut (2019)
Myriolecis carlottiana (Lewis & Śliwa) Śliwa, Zhao Xin & Lumbsch (2015)
Myriolecis congesta (Clauzade & Vězda) M.Bertrand & Cec.Roux (2016)
Myriolecis crenulata (Hook.) Śliwa, Zhao Xin & Lumbsch (2015)
Myriolecis dispersa (Pers.) Śliwa, Zhao Xin & Lumbsch (2015)
Myriolecis eurycarpa (Poelt, Leuckert & Cl.Roux) Hafellner & Türk (2016)
Myriolecis expectans (Darb.) Śliwa, Zhao Xin & Lumbsch (2015)
Myriolecis flowersiana (H.Magn.) Śliwa, Zhao Xin & Lumbsch (2015)
Myriolecis fugiens (Nyl.) Śliwa, Zhao Xin & Lumbsch (2015)
Myriolecis invadens (H.Magn.) Śliwa, Zhao Xin & Lumbsch (2015)
Myriolecis juniperina (Śliwa) Śliwa, Zhao Xin & Lumbsch (2015)
Myriolecis latzelii (Zahlbr.) Cl.Roux (2016)
Myriolecis liguriensis (B.de Lesd.) Cl.Roux (2016)
Myriolecis massei M.Bertrand & J.-Y.Monnat (2018)
Myriolecis mons-nivis (Darb.) Śliwa, Zhao Xin & Lumbsch (2015)
Myriolecis oyensis (M.Bertrand & Cl.Roux) M.Bertrand & Cl.Roux (2016)
Myriolecis percrenata (H.Magn.) Śliwa, Zhao Xin & Lumbsch (2015)
Myriolecis perpruinosa (Fröberg) Śliwa, Zhao Xin & Lumbsch (2015)
Myriolecis persimilis (Th.Fr.) Śliwa, Zhao Xin & Lumbsch (2015)
Myriolecis poeltiana (Clauzade & Cl.Roux) Śliwa, Zhao Xin & Lumbsch (2015)
Myriolecis prominens (Clauzade & Vězda) Cl.Roux & Nimis (2016)
Myriolecis prophetae-eliae (Sipman) Sipman & Cl.Roux (2016)
Myriolecis salina (H.Magn.) Śliwa, Zhao Xin & Lumbsch (2015)
Myriolecis schofieldii (Brodo) Śliwa, Zhao Xin & Lumbsch (2015)
Myriolecis sverdrupiana (Øvstedal) Śliwa, Zhao Xin & Lumbsch (2015)
Myriolecis torrida (Vain.) Śliwa, Zhao Xin & Lumbsch (2015)
Myriolecis wetmorei (Śliwa) Śliwa, Zhao Xin & Lumbsch (2015)
Myriolecis zosterae (Ach.) Śliwa, Zhao Xin & Lumbsch (2015)

References

Lecanorales
Lecanorales genera
Lichen genera